Two Thumbs Up is a 2015 Hong Kong-Chinese action comedy film directed by first-time director Lau Ho-leung and starring Francis Ng, Simon Yam, Leo Ku, Patrick Tam, Mark Cheng, Christie Chen and Philip Keung.

Plot
On 5 April 2014, Twitch released a plot synopsis of the film:

Cast
 Francis Ng as Lucifer (盧西發)
 Simon Yam as Chow Tai-po (周大寶)
 Leo Ku as Officer Tsui On-leung (徐安良)
 Patrick Tam as Johnny To (杜忡尼)
 Mark Cheng as Lam Tung (林東)
 Christie Chen as Robber Girl
 Philip Keung as Chief of Robbers
 Rock Ji as Robber A
 Jie Zhuang as Ice Cream Lady
 Jamie Cheung as Tsang Ching-yee (曾靜儀)
 Siu Yam-yam as Wild Boar Aunt (野豬婆婆)
 Jack Kao as Warden
 Law Wing-cheung as Bowling Alley's Owner
 Alan Mak as Tsui Po-on (徐步安)
 Felix Chong as Inspector of Police
 Mark Wu as Cup Noodle Father
 Dayo Wong as Cheung Po-keung (張寶強) (scenes removed from final cut)

Production
Principal photography for Two Thumbs Up started on 15 January 2014 where a blessing ceremony was held in which the cast and crew attended.

Release
On 24 March 2014, a press conference for Two Thumbs Up was held at the 38th Hong Kong International Film Festival where its teaser trailer was unveiled. The film premiered at the 39th Hong Kong International Film Festival which ran from 23 March to 6 April 2015 was theatrically released in Hong Kong on 2 April 2015.

Box office
The film opened third place at its debut and during the first six days of release in Hong Kong, Two Thumbs Up grossed HK$5.90 million. The film grossed HK$4.01 million between 9–12 April. After two weekends, the film have grossed a total of HK$8.91 million. During its third weekend, the film remained at third place and has made a total of HK$11.5 million to date. The film had earned  at the Chinese box office.

Awards and nominations

References

External links
 

2015 films
2015 action comedy films
2010s buddy films
2010s heist films
2010s crime comedy films
Hong Kong action comedy films
Hong Kong buddy films
Chinese detective films
Hong Kong detective films
Chinese action comedy films
Chinese crime comedy films
Hong Kong heist films
Police detective films
2010s Cantonese-language films
Films set in Hong Kong
Films set in Malaysia
Films shot in Hong Kong
2015 directorial debut films
2015 comedy films
2010s Hong Kong films